Keep Watching is a 2017 American horror thriller film directed by Sean Carter and written by Joseph Dembner. It was produced by Nicolas Chartier, Andrew Rona, Alex Heineman, Craig J. Flores, Michael Fiore, and Joseph Dembner. It stars Bella Thorne, Ioan Gruffudd, Natalie Martinez, Chandler Riggs, Leigh Whannell, Matthew Willig, and Christopher James Baker.

The film was released on October 31, 2017, by Screen Gems and later, on DVD.

Plot
The film starts with a young girl being attacked. The next morning, news reporters interview people who had seen the murder through their devices, unaware that it was real, and a news reporter says that one of the family members is missing.

Jamie – a teenage girl – and her family return home from a 10-day vacation, unaware that cameras have been set up in every corner of the house. Later that night, her father Carl gets an unexpected visit from his brother Matt, who comes over and asks to spend the night there. Carl agrees, but his new wife Olivia is not happy about it. Matt talks with Jamie and she says that she is not fond of her new stepmother  Olivia, thinking that she is trying to replace her real mother, but Matt assures Jamie that she has nothing to worry about.

Jamie Skype calls her boyfriend Josh, intending to tell him she might be pregnant, but backs out and ends the call. When everyone gets ready for bed, Matt goes outside to look for his phone and hears strange noises coming from the backyard. He is attacked with a hook. A man known as The Terror breaks into the house and takes everyone's phones, then seals all the windows outside, waking up Olivia.

Carl goes downstairs to see what the noise is and finds a flashlight with a bow on it. When he goes into the kitchen, a photo of someone standing behind him is taken, and he is smothered to death with a plastic bag in front of everyone. Jamie, her brother DJ and Olivia barricade themselves in Olivia's bedroom and they find that the family has been watched for months without anyone knowing, especially Jamie. They learn that their only chance to survive is to kill The Terror. As the remaining family members try to look for a way out, they are attacked by another intruder and they all hide in the basement, where a knife with a bow on it is discovered.

Police are heard, but they soon realize that it is a recording. Josh comes to the house and is filmed being killed by suffocation with a running hose. Olivia finds a way out of the house and she finds a red X taped on the ground by the gate.

Matt finds her but soon gets killed with an axe. Just as Olivia escapes, a van pulls up. She climbs in the back and gets attacked again. DJ is locked in a room while Jamie is attacked. She finds a red X and uses a taser she found earlier in her room on the intruder and DJ kills the intruder with a knitting needle. They unmask the intruder, revealing it to be the girl that was reported missing from the family in the last murder.

Thinking they are safe, Jamie and DJ look around and find Olivia's body, Jamie's positive pregnancy test and videos of her mother and father with baby Jamie. Soon enough, they discover that people all over the world are watching and Jamie tries to tell them to call the police, but is bleeped out and so no one will know their address. Jamie finds a mask with a bow on it and both her and DJ plan to escape.

While walking around the house, they find The Terror. Jamie pours gasoline on him and DJ throws a lighter on him, setting the house on fire in the process. Jamie and DJ escape only to be captured by The Creator and The Terror who survived. They discover that the girl they killed was the missing member of the previous family, kidnapped and forced to aid them in the attack on Jamie's family. The Creator tells Jamie that if she aids them, her brother will be safe. The Creator tasers Jamie and says that she will give the online audience a reason to keep watching.

Cast
 Bella Thorne as Jamie, a troubled teenager
 Chandler Riggs as DJ, Jamie's brother and Carl's son
 Ioan Gruffudd as Carl, Jamie and DJ's father
 Natalie Martinez as Olivia, Carl's new wife
 James Connor as Therapist, whom Jamie is seeing professionally
 Maya Eshet as The Wasp
 Matthew Willig as The Terror 
 Leigh Whannell as Matt, Carl's brother and Jamie and DJ's uncle
 Jared Abrahamson as Josh, Jamie's boyfriend
 Christopher James Baker as The Creator (voice) and Christopher Baker as The Creator (man behind the mask)

Production
Originally titled Home Invasion, the screenplay was developed by former Silver Pictures executive Alex Heineman with screenwriter Joseph Dembner. In early 2013, Producer Michael Fiore and Director Sean Carter developed and filmed a sequence from Dembner's script in coordination with the producing team at Silver Pictures and Dembner. That demo secured Sean Carter's role as director on the feature version. In April 2013, Voltage Pictures secured the rights to the screenplay. In July 2013, Bella Thorne was the first confirmed name, announced as the lead role, Jamie. In September 2013, Natalie Martinez was also confirmed. Ioan Gruffudd and Chandler Riggs completed the main cast in October. Filming began in Altadena, California, in late November 2013.

Release
In October 2015, Screen Gems acquired distribution rights to the film, changing the title from Home Invasion to Keep Watching. The film was originally scheduled to be released on December 2, 2016. It was released for one night on October 31, 2017.

See also
 List of films featuring home invasions

References

External links
 
 

Films set in 2015
2017 horror thriller films
2010s psychological horror films
2017 psychological thriller films
2017 films
2017 horror films
American horror thriller films
American psychological horror films
American psychological thriller films
Films about families
Films shot in Los Angeles County, California
Home invasions in film
Voltage Pictures films
2017 directorial debut films
2010s English-language films
2010s American films